An editor's cut of a motion picture is made by the film editor on their own, or working with the film director. The editor tapes together the first cut of the film, the "editor's cut", arranging the separate takes into a coherent story according to the plan communicated by the director. The editor's version of the film will often be as much as two hours beyond the final running time of the film. Working from the editor's cut, decisions then need to be made, usually together with other creative staff, to improve continuity, balance the story, trim or delete scenes, etc.
  
A version supposedly nearer to the director's original creative vision is sometimes marketed as a director's cut. These special-market versions of a movie DVD are more expensive than the regular edition, as they are usually longer than the theatre version, and have extra discs often including "making of ... " documentaries, out-take collections, extended interviews with cast and crew, etc.
 
Film and video terminology